Outright Scotland is an LGBT rights organisation based in Edinburgh, Scotland. Founded as the Scottish Minorities Group in 1969, it was the country's first LGBT rights organisation.

History
The Scottish Minorities Group (SMG) was a Scottish gay rights group officially founded in Glasgow on 9 May 1969. The group was a self-help organisation working for the rights of homosexual men and women, and had the aims of providing counselling, working for law reform and providing meeting places for lesbians and gay men.

The group's first meeting in January 1969 was organised by Ian Dunn at his parents' home in Glasgow. On 9 May 1969, the group was officially launched at an open meeting in the Protestant Chaplaincy Centre of Glasgow University that was attended by about 25 men and women. SMG meetings moved to the basement of the Catholic Chaplaincy in Edinburgh with the support of its chaplain Father Anthony Ross in August 1969.

A monthly newsletter, SMG News, was started in January 1971. In the same year the group organised the Cobweb disco, which was Scotland's first gay disco. The DJ was Willie Peacock, it was held every Saturday, and it grew to draw visitors from all over Scotland and became "the" place to go after the Kenilworth on a Saturday night. The SMG Glasgow Women's Group was launched along with its magazine Gayzette.

In 1972, SMG started the Edinburgh Gay Switchboard. SMG organised the International Gay Rights Congress held in the Student's Union of Edinburgh University from 18–22 December 1974. It concluded with a disco which ended with John and Yoko Lennon's "Happy Christmas War Is over", by this time there was a positive feeling that the fight for gay equality was almost over too.  Around 400 people attended the event and it led to the setting up of the International Gay Association in 1978. At the end of 1974 premises at Broughton Street, Edinburgh were purchased and the SMG Information Centre opened there in the Spring of 1975. The "Cobweb" had lost its premises because of the move and in its place SMG moved to a monthly one-nighter fund raising disco on the third Tuesday of the month at Cinderella Rockerfella's in the city's St. Stephen Street.

In October 1974 the Paedophile Information Exchange, a pro-paedophile activist group was founded as a special interest group within the Scottish Minorities Group. SMG founder Ian Dunn was among the founding members of PIE.

By 1977 the premises hosted a coffeeshop, a bookstall, a "befriending service" (non-directive counselling by telephone and face to face and modelled loosely on the approach taken by the Samaritans) and offered a friendly, sociable and informative environment to homosexuals of both sexes. The property had a large window onto a busy main street and openly proclaimed its purpose. Today this is the Edinburgh LGBT Centre. In the late 1970s a gay youth group met weekly in the basement of the University Catholic Chaplaincy although this was short-lived in the legally ambiguous climate that then prevailed in Scotland.

In 1977, the Glasgow Gay Centre was opened in Sauchiehall Street. In 1978, SMG News became Gay Scotland and in October the SMG changed its name to the Scottish Homosexual Rights Group (SHRG). In 1980, Robin Cook's amendment to the 1980 Criminal Justice (Scotland) Bill partially decriminalised gay sex between men over 21. This allowed a commercial scene to develop and Bennets Nightclub opened in Glasgow in 1981. There was subsequently less demand for community facilities. At its peak in 1982, SHRG had 1200 members. However, the Glasgow Gay Centre closed in 1982.

In 1988 the SHRG organised its first Lark in the Park in Edinburgh’s Princes Street gardens, the event was the precursor to Pride Scotia, which began in 1995.

In 1992, SHRG changed its name to Outright Scotland.

Today
Latterly focusing on work around the Scottish Parliament, Scottish Executive and Scottish Public Institutions such as the National Health Service, Police and Justice System, Outright Scotland is currently dormant with much of their former role being taken by the Equality Network and Stonewall Scotland.

See also

LGBT rights in the United Kingdom
List of LGBT rights organisations

References

External links
Outright Scotland — official website
Papers of the Scottish Minorities Group and Scottish Homosexual Rights Group held at LSE Archives

Organizations established in 1969
Organisations based in Edinburgh
LGBT political advocacy groups in Scotland
1969 establishments in Scotland
Organisations based in Glasgow